Brachioteuthis beanii is a species of squid in the family Brachioteuthidae, that lives in pelagic environments. Its young are 1.2 mm in length.

Distribution and habitat 
Its range is in the Western Atlantic, near Canada and the United States. It lives at depths of 0 to 860 meters, with young hanging out by the surface from 0 to 200 meters deep, and individuals having a mating behavior 5 to 60 meters above the ocean floor.

Conservation 
Brachioteuthis beanii has no specific threats, and inhabits a wide range in areas where human impact does not have much effect. It is considered as "Least Concern" by the IUCN Red List.

References 

Squid
Cephalopods described in 1881
Molluscs of the Atlantic Ocean